Lizabeth Scott (1922–2015) appeared in 22 feature films from 1945 to 1972. In addition to stage and radio, she appeared on television from the late 1940s to early 1970s.

Stage
Lizabeth Scott attended Scranton's Central High School, where she performed in several plays. After graduating, she spent the summer working with the Mae Desmond Players at a stock theater in the nearby community of Newfoundland. She then travelled down to Abingdon, Virginia and worked at the Barter Theatre. After an 18-month tour of 63 cities across the US with one of the three Hellzapoppin companies touring the US, Scott returned to New York City in the spring of 1942, where she joined a summer stock company at the 52nd Street Theatre on the subway circuit, the then equivalent of off-Broadway. Eventually, she starred as Sadie Thompson in John Colton's play Rain (1923). This role lead to Scott being chosen for as understudy for Tallulah Bankhead's Sabina, the leading lady role in the first Broadway production of The Skin of Our Teeth. Scott only played Sabina twice on Broadway, but replaced Miriam Hopkins for two weeks in the Boston run. As a Paramount contract player, Scott returned to the stage in 1949 as the titular character in Anna Lucasta.

Filmography
Though Lizabeth Scott began as a comedian on stage (Hellzapoppin, The Skin of Our Teeth), her film career is associated with film noir by film historians and public alike. Of the 22 feature films she starred in, 15 of them are noir-themed. Scott appeared in traditional black-and-white noirs, as well as noir variants, which include Western (Silver Lode), color (Desert Fury), comedy (Scared Stiff), Science Fiction (Stolen Face) and drama (The Company She Keeps).
 
With the exception of her Variety Girl cameo, Scott was the leading lady for all films she appeared in (she shared top billing with Barbara Stanwyck in The Strange Love of Martha Ivers). While Scott was signed to Paramount Pictures, she was often on loan to other studios, as was the standard practice during the studio system era. She worked with half of the eight major studios during the Golden Age of film. As a result, almost half her output and several of her best known films were with studios other than Paramount.

 indicates films in the public domain. See cites for copyright renewal dates.

Radio
During the Golden Age of Radio, Scott would reprise her film roles in abridged radio versions. Typical were her appearances on Lux Radio Theatre: You Came Along with Van Johnson in the Robert Cummings role and I Walk Alone. Scott would also recreate on radio the original film roles of other actresses such as Loretta Young (The Perfect Marriage) and Veronica Lake (Saigon). Scott would even reprise Barbara Stanwyck's role in The Strange Love of Martha Ivers. One notable radio performance was the Molle Mystery Theatre episode, Female Of The Species, in which Scott is Eva Lester, the owner of a beauty salon. Lester tries to murder the rich wife of a man she is having an affair with. Scott was also a guest host/narrator on Family Theater.

Television
Lizabeth Scott transitioned from the radio versions of programs she previously voiced. She continued to guest host for the television version of Family Theater, as well as acting in the then new Lux Video Theatre. Returning to her vaudeville origins, she also appeared in variety programs like the Colgate Comedy Hour and made her singing debut on The Big Record. The 1960s saw Scott continuing to guest-star on television, including a notable 1960 episode of Adventures in Paradise, "The Amazon," opposite Gardner McKay. In Burke's Law "Who Killed Cable Roberts?" (1963), she appears as the widow of a celebrity big game hunter. Scott returned to 20th Century Fox to film "The Luck of Harry Lime" (1965), an episode of The Third Man. She was directed by her former costar Paul Henreid from Stolen Face. She also appeared on the occasional game show opposite actors like John Wayne and George Hamilton.

Titles in the public domain.* See cites for copyright renewal dates.

References

External links
 Lizabeth Scott at the American Film Institute
 

Actress filmographies
American filmographies